Réal Godbout is a Quebec writer and comic book illustrator, best known for his Michel Risque and Red Ketchup series which he co-created with his long-time friend Pierre Fournier.

Biography
In the 70's, Godbout published his comic strips in periodicals such as BD and L’Illustré, and in the daily Le Jour. He joined the magazine Croc with its first issue where he co-created, co-wrote and illustrated the Michel Risque and Red Ketchup series. Both series have been reprinted by La Pastèque of Montreal.

More recently, his work has contributed educational strips to the young readers’ magazine Les Débrouillards, and he made headlines with his award-winning adaptation of Kafka’s novel Amerika. In 2015, collaborating with his daughter Adèle, Godbout wrote and illustrated a fable, Avant l’Apocalypse. Godbout teaches comic art at the University of Québec in Outaouais.

He is currently working on the script for the feature film adaptation of Red Ketchup, along with his co-creator Pierre Fournier and filmmaker Martin Villeneuve.

Awards
Both Réal Godbout and Pierre Fournier have received the Joe Shuster Award with their induction, individually, into the Canadian Comic Book Creators Hall of Fame. In 2016, they were formally listed among the “100 Indispensable Québec Authors” by the Maison de la Littérature in Québec City.

References

External links
 La Pastèque Official Site 
 Red Ketchup on the big screen at BULB

1951 births
Living people
Artists from Montreal
French Quebecers
Canadian cartoonists
Canadian comics artists
Canadian comics writers
Canadian screenwriters in French
Writers from Montreal